Samuel Olatunde Fadahunsi  (17 March 1920 – 12 August 2014) was a Nigerian civil engineer and former President of COREN, an engineering regulation body in Nigeria.

Life and career
He was born on 17 March 1920 in Osun State, southwestern Nigeria.
He was educated at Saint John School, Iloro, Ilesha, Osun State (1927-1936). He also attended Government College, Ibadan (1937-1942). In 1948, he received a scholarship that earned him a bachelor's degree in  Civil engineering at the Battersea Polytechnic in London.
Having completed his bachelor's degree in 1952, he joined the service of Cubits, British engineering company, where he worked for two years. 
He returned to Nigeria, where he became a full engineer in 1954. He left to England in 1957 for a post graduate (PGD) training as a water engineer. He completed the program in 1958 and returned to Nigeria as a Senior Engineer in various towns in the old Western Region, including Abeokuta, Ibadan and Benin. He later rose to the position of a  Chief Water Engineer in the old Western Region of Nigeria (1960-1963). He later became the Deputy Chief Executive Officer (1963-1965) and Chief Executive Officer, Lagos Executive Development Board (LEDB), now Lagos State Development and Property Corporation (LSDPC) (1965-1972). 
He served as Chairman of Industrial Research Council of Nigeria between 1971 and 1974

Fellowship
Foundation Fellow of The Nigerian Academy of Engineering.

Awards
Certificate of Honour, Nigerian Boys Scouts Movement.
Officer of the Order of Niger, OFR (1982)
Commander of the Order of Niger, CON (2002)

References

See also
Ilesha
Olateju Oyeleye

1934 births
2014 deaths
Nigerian civil engineers
Yoruba engineers
Government College, Ibadan alumni
Nigerian expatriates in the United Kingdom
People from Osun State
Alumni of the University of Surrey